The Autumn Harvest Uprising was an insurrection that took place in Hunan and Jiangxi provinces of China, on September 7, 1927, led by Mao Zedong, who established a short-lived Hunan Soviet.

After initial success, the uprising was brutally put down by Kuomintang forces. Mao continued to believe in the rural strategy but concluded that it would be necessary to form a party army.

Background
In support of the Northern Expedition, Mao was sent to survey peasant conditions in his home province of Hunan. His Report on an Investigation of the Peasant Movement in Hunan urged support for rural revolution.

The uprising
Initially, Mao struggled to garner forces for an uprising, but Li Zhen rallied the peasantry and members of her local communist troop to join. Mao then led a small peasant army against the Kuomintang and the landlords of Hunan, successfully establishing a Soviet government. The uprising was eventually defeated by Kuomintang forces within two months after the Soviet was established. Mao and the others were forced to retreat to the Jinggang Mountains on the border between Hunan and Jiangxi provinces, where he encountered an army of miners which would help him in later battles. This was one of the early armed uprisings by the Communists, and it marked a significant change in their strategy. Mao and Red Army founder Zhu De went on to develop a rural-based strategy that centered on guerrilla tactics. This paved the way for the Long March of 1934.

Mass killings against  Hunanese civilians
Nationalist anti-communist mass killings were directed against all Hunanese civilians. About 80,000 Hunanese were killed in Hunan's Liling and about 300,000 Hunanese were killed in Hunan's Chaling County, Leiyang, Liuyang and Pingjiang.

Notes

References and further reading 
  Reprinted: De Gruyter, 2014 eBook  
 Li, Xiaobing. China at War: An Encyclopedia (ABC-CLIO, 2012) pp 15–16.

Conflicts in 1927
1927 protests
September 1927 events
Military operations of the Chinese Civil War
1927 in China
Military history of Hunan
Military history of Jiangxi